Northern Garrett High School is a four-year public secondary education school located just North of Accident, Maryland, United States, that houses approximately 500 students from the northern end of Garrett County. It is part of the Garrett County Public Schools school district. The school mascot is the Husky and the school colors are royal blue and gold.

Population 
The approximately 500 students of Northern High School come from Accident, Friendsville, Grantsville, and Route 40 Elementary Schools and Northern Garrett Middle School. Most students are from the towns of Accident, Friendsville, Jennings, Grantsville, and Finzel.

School Days 
Students attend school for 180 days per school year starting from the last week of August through the end of May, and normally through the first several days of June as well. Five additional days are added to the calendar as make-up days. Due to the tremendous amounts of snowfall in Garrett County, it is not unusual for the school to need additional make-up days; therefore, they either add days at the end of the school year or during scheduled days off.

The day is divided into 4 periods and a study hall period, which was reduced in 2009 from 7 periods in an effort to unify the county's two high schools, including Southern Garrett High School

Special Classes 
Northern Garrett High School has 9 Advanced Placement choices available for the students:
 AP Biology
 AP Calculus AB
 AP Computer Science A
 AP Computer Science Principles
 AP English Language & Composition
 AP English Literature & Composition
 AP Environmental Geoscience
 AP Studio Art
 AP U.S. History

Along with AP classes, Northern Garrett High School partners with Garrett Community College to offer seniors the ability to take college classes and earn college credits while still in high school. The high school and college offer a variety of classes for senior students.

Special Events 

War of the Classes

During the early dismissal before students leave for Thanksgiving break, students gather in the gymnasium. Ten to twelve students from each grade are selected to compete against the other grades in games such as "Turkey Bowling," War of the Classes, and the Loudest Class.

Pep Rally

During the last Friday before the homecoming football game, students and faculty gather in the gymnasium to prepare the football team and their fans for the first home game of the year. During this time, homecoming courts are announced.

References

External links

Garrett County Board of Education Website

High schools in Garrett County, Maryland
Public high schools in Maryland